Chhuchhakwas is a village in Jhajjar district of Haryana state, India, having pincode 124106,
located 13 km from district headquarters on NH334B. Majority in the village are Ahirs which popularly known as Rao Sahab  .

Ecological corridor
The water bodies around canal between Godhari and Chhuchakwas are the important part of ecological corridor along the route of Sahibi River which traverses from Aravalli hills in Rajasthan to Yamuna via Masani barrage, Matanhail forest, Chhuchhakwas-Godhari, Khaparwas Wildlife Sanctuary, Bhindawas Wildlife Sanctuary, Outfall Drain Number 8 and 6, Sarbashirpur, Sultanpur National Park, Basai and The Lost Lake (Gurugram).

See also 
 List of National Parks & Wildlife Sanctuaries of Haryana, India
 History of Haryana

References

Villages in Jhajjar district